Algebraic & Geometric Topology is a peer-reviewed mathematics journal published quarterly by Mathematical Sciences Publishers.
Established in 2001, the journal publishes articles on topology.
Its 2018 MCQ was 0.82, and its 2018 impact factor was 0.709.

External links

Mathematics journals
Publications established in 2001
English-language journals
Mathematical Sciences Publishers academic journals
Quarterly journals